Sorbitan monolaurate is a mixture of esters formed from the fatty acid lauric acid and polyols derived from sorbitol, including sorbitan and isosorbide.  As a food additive, it is designated with the E number E493.

See also
 Sorbitan monostearate

References

Laurate esters
Food additives
Non-ionic surfactants
E-number additives